Live from Wembley Arena, London, England is a Pink music DVD released on March 22, 2007. It was recorded at London's Wembley Arena on December 4, 2006 during her I'm Not Dead Tour. The performances of "Lady Marmalade" and Bob Marley's "Redemption Song" are not included on the DVD. In Australia it was released M: Moderate Coarse Language.

The release was largely successful, especially in Australia, where it debuted at #1 on the ARIA DVD chart and has been certified 16 times platinum.

Track listing

Charts and certifications

Charts

Certifications

Notes

Pink (singer) video albums
2007 video albums